Kermanshah Province is one of the 31 provinces of Iran. The province was known from 1969 to 1986 as Kermanshahan, and from 1986 to 1995 as Bakhtaran. The capital of the province is the city of Kermanshah. According to a 2014 segmentation by the Ministry of Interior, it is the center of Region 4, with the region's central secretariat located in Kermanshah. A majority of people in Kermanshah Province are Shia, and there are Sunni and Yarsani minority groups.

At the time of the National Census conducted in 2006, the population of Kermanshah province was 1,842,457 in 444,185 households. By the time of the following census in 2011, there were 1,945,227 people in 530,911 households. At the latest census in 2016, Kermanshah had a population of 1,952,434 in 576,861 households.

Geography

Kermanshah province is located in western Iran. It shares borders with the provinces of Kurdistan, Hamadan, Lorestan, and Ilam within Iran. It also shares borders with the Iraqi governorates of Halabja, Sulaymaniyah and Diyala.
Major cities and towns besides the capital include Eslamabad-e Gharb, Gilan-e Gharb, Harsin, Javanrud, Kangavar, Paveh, Qasr-e Shirin, Ravansar, Sahneh, Sarpol-e Zahab, and Sonqor.

Climate 
As it is situated between two cold and warm regions, Kermanshah province enjoys a moderate and mountainous climate. It rains most in winter and is moderately warm in summer. The annual rainfall is 500 mm. The average temperature in the hottest months is above 22 °C.

History 

The province has a rich Paleolithic heritage. Many caves with Paleolithic remains have been surveyed or excavated there. some of these cave sites are located in Bisetun and north of Kermanshah. The first known physical remains of Neanderthal man in Iran was discovered in Bisitun Cave. Do-Ashkaft Cave, Kobeh, Warwasi, and Mar Tarik are some of the Middle Paleolithic sites in the region. Kermanshah also has many Neolithic sites, of which the most famous are Ganj Dareh, Sarab, and Asiab. At Ganj Dareh, the earliest evidence for goat domestication have been documented. In May 2009, based on a research conducted by the University of Hamedan and UCL, the head of Archeology Research Center of Iran's Cultural Heritage and Tourism Organization announced that the oldest prehistoric village in the Middle East dating back to 9800 B.C., was discovered in Sahneh, located in west of Kermanshah.

The monuments found in Kermanshah show two glorious periods, the Achaemenid and Sassanid eras. The mythical ruler of the Pishdadian is described as founding the city while Tahmores Divband built it. An alternative narrative is that the construction was by Bahram IV of the Sassanid dynasty during the 4th century CE. Kermanshah reached a peak during the reign of Hormizd IV and Khosrau I of Sassanids, before being demoted to a secondary royal residence.

The city suffered major damage during the Arab invasions but recovered in the Safavid period to make great progress. Concurrent with the Afghan attack and the fall of Isfahan, Kermanshah was almost completely destroyed by the Ottoman invasion.

During the Iran–Iraq War the province suffered heavy fighting. Most towns and cities were badly damaged and some like Sar-e Pol-e Zahab and Qhasr-e-Shirin were almost completely destroyed.

The November 2017 Iran–Iraq earthquake killed more than 600 people.

On December 28, 2017, Kermanshah became one of several Iranian provinces to break out into protests.  The Supreme Leader of Iran has blamed western interference.  Some female organizations such as The National Council of Resistance of Iran (NCRI) have taken partial credit for the organization of these protests.

Administrative divisions

Cities 
According to the 2016 census, 1,468,615 people (over 75% of the population of Kermanshah province) live in the following cities: Banevreh 3,187, Bayangan 1,513, Bisotun 4,942, Eslamabad-e Gharb 90,559, Ezgeleh 1,502, Gahvareh 4,050, Gilan-e Gharb 22,331, Gowdin 2,629, Halashi 804, Harsin 44,146, Homeyl 1,317, Javanrud 54,354, Kangavar 51,352, Kerend-e Gharb 7,798, Kermanshah 946,651, Kuzaran 4,007, Miyan Rahan 695, Nowdeshah 3,683, Nowsud 1,949, Paveh 25,771, Qasr-e Shirin 18,473, Ravansar 24,527, Robat 823, Sahneh 35,508, Sarmast 2,913, Sarpol-e Zahab 45,481, Satar 1,048, Shahrak-e Rijab 3,907, Shahu 3,558, Sonqor 44,256, Sumar 180, and Tazehabad 14,701.

City of Kermanshah 
The province's capital is Kermanshah, located in the middle of the western part of Iran. The population of the city is 946,651 as of 2016. It is built on the slopes of Mt. Sefid Kooh and extended toward south during last two decades. The built-up areas run alongside Sarab River and Sarab Valley. The city's elevation averages about 1,350 meters above sea level.

The distance between Kermanshah and Tehran is 525 km. It is the trade center of rich agricultural region that produces grain, rice, vegetable, fruits, and oilseeds, and there are many industrial centers, oil and sugar refineries, and cement, textile and flour factories, etc. The airport (Shahid Ashrafi Esfahani Airport) is located in north east of the city, and the distance from Tehran is 413 km by air.

Economy

International and border trade
Kermanshah province has 371 km of common border with Iraq.There are five official border markets in the province. Three of these neighbor the Kurdish part of Iraq and the other two the Iraqi central government (Khosravi, Sumar). Based on figures from 9 November 2021, with a share of 5.7 to 6 percent Kermanshah province is among the first five exporters of non-oil products of Iran. Around 30 to 35 percent of theses exports were from the province's own products. The highest share of exports belong to Parviz border which neighbors Iraqi Kurdistan followed by Khosravi and Sumar.

Exports from Kermanshah Province hit $2.7 billion in the fiscal year 2021-22 (ending March 20), registering a 15% growth compared with the previous year, according to a local official.

The province's share in Iran's total exports during the period stood at 10% in terms of tonnage and 12% in value.

Kermanshah's share in total exports to Iraq stood at 53% and share in non-oil goods reached 43%.

Non-oil exports from Kermanshah mainly include tomato and tomato paste, air conditioners, cheese, industrial oil and their derivatives, biscuit, different types of melon, watermelon, tile and ceramic, plastic bags, marble, yogurt, milk, cream, cucumber, eggplant, apple and melamine dishes.

Local products
Kermanshah lends its name to a type of Persian carpet named after the region. It also has famous sweets made of rice, locally known as Nan-e berenji. The other famous Kermanshahi good is a special kind of oil, locally known as Rüne Dân and globally in Iran known as Roghan Kermanshahi. The Giveh of Kermanshah known as Klash is the highest quality Giveh.

Historical attractions 
Various attractions exist that date from the pre-Islamic era, such as the Kohneh Bridge, to contemporary parks and museums. Some of the more popular sites are:
 Bisotun: 
 Darius the Great's inscription at Bisotun, which dates to 522 BCE, lies some 1300 meters high in the mountains, and counts as one of the most famous sites in Near Eastern archeology. The site is a UNESCO World Heritage Site, and has been attracting visitors for centuries. The Behistun inscription is to Old Persian cuneiform what the Rosetta Stone is to Egyptian hieroglyphs: the trilingual inscription (in Old Persian, Elamite and Akkadian) was crucial in the decipherment of the script. The relief above the inscription depicts Darius facing nine rebels who objected to his crowning. At the king's feet lies Gaumata. The location of this important historical document is not coincidental: Gaumata, a usurper who is depicted as lying at Darius' feet, was a Medean and in Achaemenid times Behistun lay on the Medea-Parsa highway.

 Behistun is also notable for three reliefs at the foot of the hill that date from the Parthian era. Among them is a Hellenistic-era depiction of the divinity Bahram as the Greek hero Hercules, who reclines with a goblet in his hand, a club at his feet and a lion-skin beneath him. Because it lies on the route of an ancient highway, this life-size rock sculpture may reflect Bahram's status as patron divinity of travelers.
 Taq-e Bostan:
One of the more impressive reliefs, inside the largest grotto (ivan), is the oversized depiction of Sassanid king Khosrau II (591–628 CE), who appears mounted on his favorite charger, Shabdiz. Both the horse and the rider are arrayed in full battle armor.
 There are two hunting scenes on complementary sides of the ivan: one depicts an imperial boar hunt and the other depicting the king stalking deer. Elephants flush out the boar from a marshy lake for the king who stands poised with bow and arrow in hand while he is serenaded by female musicians following in other boats. These royal hunting scenes are narrative murals in stone are count among the most vivid of all Iranian rock reliefs.
 The Taq-e Bostan reliefs are not limited to the Sassanid era. An upper relief depicts the 19th century Qajar king Fath-Ali shah holding court.
 The Kangavar archaeological complex: 
 Kangavar is the site of the archaeological remains of a vast Hellenic-style edifice on a raised platform. The visible remains at the site date to early Sassanid times, but the platform of the complex may be several centuries older. By the time excavation began in 1968, the complex had been preemptorily associated with a comment by Isidore of Charax who referred to a temple of Anahita at Concobar (the Greek name of Kangavar, which was then in Lower Medea). Despite archaeological findings to the contrary, the association with the divinity of fertility, healing, and wisdom has made the site a popular tourist attraction. The vast edifice was built of enormous blocks of dressed stone with an imposing entrance of opposed staircases that may have been inspired by the Apadana in Persepolis.

Higher education

Higher education and research
 Kermanshah University of Medical Sciences
 Razi University
 Islamic Azad University of Kermanshah

Notable people

One of the renowned scientists and writers of this region is Al-Dinawari who was born at Dinawar north-east of Kermanshah. He lived in the 9th century and has written many books in astronomy, botany and history.
Notable people born in Kermansha include British author, Nobel prize winner, Doris Lessing, whose father, a British army officer, was stationed there at the time of her birth.
Mirza Ahmad Khan Motazed-Dowleh Vaziri created the first printing office and founded the first private school of Kermanshahan. Guity Novin a painter and a graphic designer who has founded the Transpressionism movement was born in Kermanshah. The famous Sufi Scholar, Abdul Qader Gailani, was born in the region.

See also 
 Kalhor

References

Sources

External links

 Kirmashan website, Kurdish Culture
 Yarsan
 A Persian article about Giveh 

 
Provinces of Iran
Iranian Kurdistan